Thicker Than Water is a Big Finish Productions audio drama based on the long-running British science fiction television series Doctor Who. It is a sequel to the earlier audio play Arrangements for War.

Plot
It is three years since the Sixth Doctor helped repel the Killoran invasion of Világ, and he brings a new friend, Mel, to meet an old one. Evelyn Smythe, his former companion is now married to Principal Triumvir Rossiter. But Evelyn has made political enemies, among them her own stepdaughter Sofia, and the reunion takes a deadly turn when Evelyn and Mel are kidnapped.

Cast
The Doctor — Colin Baker
Evelyn Smythe — Maggie Stables
Mel — Bonnie Langford
Principal Triumvir Rossiter — Gabriel Woolf
Dr Sofia Rossiter — Rachel Pickup
Dr Andrew Szabó — Patrick Romer
Dr Sebastian Lawrence — Simon Watts
Jenner — Matt Dineen
TV Interviewer — James Parsons

Continuity
This story revisits the world Világ, first heard in Arrangements for War.
This story features an uncredited appearance by Sylvester McCoy as the Seventh Doctor.
It is revealed in this story that Hex, who is a companion of the Seventh Doctor, is the son of Cassie from Project: Twilight and Project: Lazarus.  The Doctor discovered this in The Harvest.
Evelyn may recognize the Seventh Doctor as she previously watched him from afar in The 100 Days of the Doctor. They properly meet again in A Death in the Family.

External links
Big Finish Productions – Thicker than Water

2005 audio plays
Sixth Doctor audio plays